Edison High School is located in Fresno, California, United States, as part of the Fresno Unified School District. It is a public high school located next to Computech Middle School. Edison high school lowest grade 9 highest grade 12.

Founded c. 1906, the school was first named Edison Technical High School until a major renovation in the 1960s, when the name became the current Edison High School. In 1982–1983, Irwin Junior High School, located adjacent Edison High School was finally integrated by 1985, forming a larger campus; Edison Computech High School.

It is currently a Magnet school in the academic areas of math and science. Academically, it is one of the highest ranked schools in the San Joaquin Valley. It is also competitively ranked among the highest on an academic level among all high schools in the State of California.
Edison is also a public school. The school integrates underperforming neighborhood students with magnet students.

As of the 2009–10 school year, the school had an enrollment of 2,326 students and 90.6 classroom teachers (on an FTE basis), for a student-teacher ratio of 25.7.
Budget cuts have allowed a wider ratio.

Awards and recognition
Edison High School has been consistently recognized as one of the country's top high schools in Newsweek magazine's rankings since their inception, which are based on the number of Advanced Placement Program (AP) exams. On May 13, 2011, Edison has created an all-time state record of the most students taking the AP Human Geography Exam at one time. The school has been ranked #79 in the 1998 listing, #83 in 2000, #166 in 2003 and #331 in 2005.

The school was recognized by the California State Board of Education as a California Distinguished School in 2001. The school was also honored with the award in 1990 and 1992, and again in 2007.

In 1975 Edison High School Football Team won the Valley Championship with a 13-0 Record.

In 2014 Edison High School Football Team won the Division One Valley Championship for the first time in 39 years with a 12–1 record.
Boys Basketball holds State Record 23 Section Titles

Extracurricular activities
In 2009, the school's Academic Decathlon team had its historic run of 13 consecutive titles of the Fresno County Academic Decathlon competition ended. They have since managed to win one title.

In 2007, the National Forensic League recognized the school's forensic team with its "Leading Chapter Award".

As of 2006 holds weekly meetings of The Simpsons Club. This particular chapter is titled EHS DOH, Edison High Schools/Edison Honors Simpsons Divine Order of Homers.

As of 2007 published Feckless, the first student run humor magazine.

As of 2008 Feckless is now available on iTunes as a weekly podcast simply titled "Feckless Film".

The school ranks consistently as the best performing Science Olympiad team from a Fresno Unified public school and, as of 2019, has the largest team of any public school in the district with over 30 members. Science Olympiad is currently the school's largest student-run STEM program.

FHA-HERO club has competed in several events such as Apparel Construction, Prepared Speech, Fashion Design, Chapter Activities Manual, Consumer Education, and other competitions. Not only do the students win awards for their achievement in these events, but a number even won sewing machines, cash, and scholarships that range up to $24,000.

Other student-run clubs include Hmong Club, Philosophy Club, Model United Nations, Thread (literary and artistic magazine), Future Business Leaders of America (F.B.L.A.), Science Olympiad, Bad Movie Club, Gay Straight Alliance (GSA), German Club, French Club, Rock Paper Scissors Society, Mathematics Engineering Science Achievement (MESA), the award-winning Math Team, and Students With Amazing Talents (S.W.A.T.).

Notable alumni

 Young Corbett III (1905–1993), boxer, Welterweight and Middleweight champion. 
 Marvin X (1944-) born Marvin Ellis Jackmon, poet, playwright, essayist.
 Sherley Anne Williams (1944–1999) African American poet, novelist, professor, social critic
 Ervin Hunt (1947–), former Green Bay Packers defensive back and U.S. Olympic track team head coach, 1996 Atlanta Olympics
 Donald Slade (1947–), former San Joaquin Valley Player of the Year in basketball 1965, Director of Basketball Operations for Fresno State University
 Charle Young (1951–), former NFL tight end, NFL Rookie of the Year, All Pro. and Super Bowl champion
 Greg Boyd (1952–), former NFL defensive end with New England Patriots, Denver Broncos, San Francisco 49ers and Green Bay Packers and Super Bowl champion
 Randy Williams (1953-), 1972 Olympic gold medalist in the long jump at 1972 Munich Olympics and silver medalist at 1976 Montreal Olympics
 Joe Henderson (1947-), former professional baseball player for Chicago White Sox and Cincinnati Reds.
 Jarvis Tatum (1947–2003), former professional baseball player for the California Angels
 Elbert "Ickey" Woods (1966-), former running back for Cincinnati Bengals; notable for performing the "Ickey Shuffle"
 Tim McDonald (1965-), NFL strong safety for Phoenix Cardinals and San Francisco 49ers and Super Bowl champion
 Bruce Bowen (1971-), retired small forward for NBA's San Antonio Spurs was a 3 time NBA champion; television sports commentator
 Planet Asia (1976-), underground hip-hop artist
 Joaquin Arambula (1977-), emergency room physician and Democratic politician in California State Assembly representing  31st State Assembly district
 Ricky Manning, Jr. (1980-),  cornerback for St. Louis Rams; varsity football coach at Edison High School in 2012
 Clifton Smith (1985-), All Pro kickoff/punt returner for Tampa Bay Buccaneers
 Cliff Harris (cornerback) (1991-), former University of Oregon football star and Philadelphia Eagles draft pick
 T. J. McDonald (1991-), defensive back for St. Louis Rams, son of former NFL player Tim McDonald, graduate of USC and Edison
 Villyan Bijev (1993-), professional soccer player signed to FC Liverpool of England's Premier League
 Greg Smith (1991-), professional basketball player for Houston Rockets
 Jay Obernolte (1970-), owner of FarSight Studios, and Republican politician in California State Assembly representing 33rd State Assembly district
 Ryan Braun (1980-), former professional baseball player for Kansas City Royals
 Lolly Vegas, member of the band Redbone
 Cornell Banks Sr. (Football)| (1986-), Fresno State University (Football) Defensive Lineman. Former professional football player for NFL.

References

External links
 Edison High School website
  Edison Alumni Website

High schools in Fresno, California
Public high schools in California
Magnet schools in California
1906 establishments in California